"Still Alive" is the closing credits song from the Portal video game.

Still Alive may also refer to:
 "Still Alive", the theme song from the video game Mirror's Edge
 Still Alive – the Remixes, an extended soundtrack for the game
 Still Alive (album), the album by DJ Mayonnaise
 "Still Alive", a remix on and repackage of the EP Alive by Big Bang
 Still Alive (book), by Ruth Kluger
 "Still Alive", a song by 3 Doors Down from Us and the Night
 "Seimei/Still Alive", a single by Japanese rock band B'z